Divergence Peak is located on the border of Alberta and British Columbia. It was named in 1921 by Arthur O. Wheeler.

See also
List of peaks on the Alberta–British Columbia border
Mountains of Alberta
Mountains of British Columbia

References

Two-thousanders of Alberta
Two-thousanders of British Columbia
Canadian Rockies